British musical group Soul II Soul has released five studio albums, two compilation albums, two live albums, and eighteen singles.

Soul II Soul released their debut album Club Classics Vol. One in April 1989 and it peaked at number 1 on the UK Albums Chart. It peaked at number 14 on the US Billboard 200 albums chart and earned a 2× platinum certification in the United States by the Recording Industry Association of America (RIAA). The album's top singles, "Keep On Movin'" and "Back to Life (However Do You Want Me)", reached number one on the Billboard R&B chart and were certified platinum by the RIAA. Second album, Vol. II: 1990 – A New Decade, was released in May 1990. Their subsequent releases after their debut album were not as successful in the US, but their second release peaked at number 1 on the UK Albums chart. The first and second single, "Get a Life" and "A Dream's a Dream", charted in the top ten on the UK Singles Chart.

The group's third album, Volume III Just Right, was released in April 1992 and reached number three on the UK Albums Chart. The lead single "Joy" reached number 4 in the UK and the follow-up single "Move Me No Mountain" charted at number 31. In November 1993, a greatest hits compilation titled Volume IV The Classic Singles 88–93 was released. After a three-year hiatus working on solo projects, the group reunited to record their fourth studio album, Volume V Believe, released in July 1995. The album reached number thirteen in the UK. Two singles were released from the album: "Love Enuff" and "I Care". The first two singles charted in top twenty in UK. A final studio album, Time for Change, was released in September 1997 following their split. As of 2016, they have sold over ten million records worldwide.

Albums

Studio albums 

 Club Classics Vol. One was released as Keep on Movin' in North America..

Live albums

Compilation albums

Singles

Other appearances

References 

Discographies of British artists
Reggae discographies
Rhythm and blues discographies